The 1922 Paris–Tours was the 17th edition of the Paris–Tours cycle race and was held on 30 April 1922. The race started in Paris and finished in Tours. The race was won by Henri Pélissier.

General classification

References

1922 in French sport
1922
April 1922 sports events